Thodi Khushi Thode Gham (English: Some happiness some sadness) is an Indian soap opera  about the battle of the two genders that aired five days a week on Sony Entertainment Television India from 24 April 2006 until 6 December 2007. The show was created by Vinta Nanda, Piyush Gupta and Jatin Sethi and was produced by their production company Diamond Pictures.

Plot 
The story mainly focuses on Sneha, who is the youngest daughter-in-law of the Shah family; her battle is against her father-in-law Mansukh Lal Shah. Mansukh believes that men should be dominant over women at all times, whereas Sneha believes that both should have equal rights. Sneha is married to Pranav, who is very strong-minded and is a good son. Sneha is married in a joint family, which consists of a sweet, strong-minded but shy mother (Daya), a sweet and gentle natured daughter-in-law (Jyoti), a sweet smart gynecologist doctor turned housewife (Bhavna), a strong-minded son (Amar), a dedicated son (Manoj), a cool, modern son (Karan), a nosy aunt (Kanta Ben), an apprentice of an uncle (Bhagu Mamaji), two little children (Alisha and Bittu), a teenage daughter with big dreams (Hetal) together with loving but funny servants (Manjit and Santu). That is the Shah family, a Jain joint family living together in a male-dominated home; but with Sneha's arrival things start to go haywire.

After Sneha is married, her bhabhis (sisters-in-law) Jyoti, Bhavna, and Daya challenge Sneha to change her behavior and attitude in two months because their father-in-law is a very strict man with many rules which govern their lives. Sneha is determined to open the eyes of the other women of the household, but Mansukh is always two steps ahead of her. This show depicts how Sneha tries to change her in-laws, especially the father-in-law's behavior and thoughts about women in general. Sneha is successful after many ups and downs.

Cast 
 Deepa Parab ... Sneha Shah
 Amit Jain ... Pranav Shah
Arvind Rathod ... Mansukh Lal Shah/Bapuji  
Zankana Sheth ... Daya Shah/Maa 
 Aliraza Namdar ... Amar Shah
 Sejal Shah ... Jyoti Shah 
Sarvadaman ... Bittu Shah
Ayushi ... Alisha Shah 
 Kapil Soni ... Manoj Shah
Pranoti Pradhan ... Bhavna Shah
Ragini Nandwani ... Hetal Shah 
 Pratap Sachdev ... Karan Shah
Kalpana Diwan ... Kanta ben/Faiba
Harish Patel ... Bhangu/Mamaji
 Muskaan Nancy James as Sapna Shah

Crew
 Abhishek Vakil - Assistant Director
 Amit Sharma - Supervising Producer
 Tanveer Alam - Executive Producer
 Sushil Jain - Scheduler
 Vinta Nanda, Piyush Gupta and Jatin Sethi - Producers

Reception
Rediff.com stated, "A simple storyline and impressive performances get this serial a slot in the Top Ten New Serials list."

References

External links
Official Site on Sony TV INDIA

Indian television soap operas
2006 Indian television series debuts
2007 Indian television series endings
Sony Entertainment Television original programming